On 9 August, the European Broadcasting Union (EBU) announced that Portugal would participate in the Junior Eurovision Song Contest 2017 in Tbilisi, Georgia. This was the first time that Portugal has participated in the contest since 2007, with Portuguese broadcaster Rádio e Televisão de Portugal (RTP) being responsible for the selection of their participant.

Before Junior Eurovision

Júniores de Portugal 
The singer who performed the Portuguese entry for the Junior Eurovision Song Contest 2017 was selected through the singing competition  ("Juniors of Portugal"). 5 artists participated in a televised production named where the winner was determined by a 50/50 combination of both public vote and the votes of a jury invited by the production. The artists all performed a JESC song and a cover song. The competing song, titled "Youtuber", written by João Cabrita and Mariana Andrade, was revealed on 29 September 2017.  The jury members of Júniores de Portugal were:
Carlos Mendes – represented Portugal in Eurovision 1968 and 1972 with the songs "Verão" and "A festa da vida" and placed 11th with 5 points and 7th with 90 points respectively.
Inês Santos – represented Portugal in Eurovision 1998 as a member of the group Alma Lusa with the song "Se eu te pudesse abraçar"
Pedro Gonçalves – participated in Festival da Canção 2017 with the song "Don't Walk Away" and placed 6th with 13 points.

Final 
The final, hosted by Jorge Gabriel and Sónia Araújo, took place on 5 October 2017 in RTP Studios in Porto. Filipa Ferreira and Mariana Venâncio was tied at 9 points each but since Mariana Venâncio received the most votes from the televoting she was declared the winner.

Artist and song information

Mariana Venâncio

Mariana Venâncio (born 4 October 2006 in Lisbon) is a Portuguese child singer. She represented Portugal in the Junior Eurovision Song Contest 2017 with the song "Youtuber".

"Youtuber"
"Youtuber" is a song by the Portuguese child singer Mariana Venâncio. It represented Portugal in the Junior Eurovision Song Contest 2017.

At Junior Eurovision
During the opening ceremony and the running order draw which both took place on 20 November 2017, Portugal was drawn to perform in position 6 on 26 November 2017, following Belarus and preceding Ireland.

Voting

Detailed voting results

References

Junior Eurovision Song Contest
Portugal
Junior
Junior Eurovision Song Contest